Knight Rider is an American action crime drama television series created and produced by Glen A. Larson. The series was originally broadcast on NBC from September 26, 1982, to April 4, 1986. The show stars David Hasselhoff as Michael Knight, a sleek and modern crime fighter assisted by KITT, an advanced, artificially intelligent, self-aware, and nearly indestructible car. This was the last series Larson devised at Universal Television before he moved to 20th Century Fox Television.

Plot
Self-made billionaire Wilton Knight rescues police Detective Lieutenant Michael Arthur Long after a near fatal shot to the face, giving him a new identity (by plastic surgery) and a new name: Michael Knight. Wilton selects Michael to be the primary field agent in the pilot program of his public justice organization, the Foundation for Law and Government (FLAG). The other half of this pilot program is the Knight Industries Two Thousand (KITT), a heavily modified, technologically advanced Pontiac Firebird Trans Am with numerous features, including an extremely durable shell and frame, controlled by a computer with artificial intelligence. Michael and KITT are brought in during situations where "direct action might provide the only feasible solution".

Heading FLAG is Devon Miles, who provides Michael with directives and guidance. Dr. Bonnie Barstow is the chief engineer in charge of KITT's care, as well as technical assistant to Devon (April Curtis fills this role in Season 2).

Cast and characters
 David Hasselhoff as Michael Knight (born Michael Arthur Long), an undercover detective of the Los Angeles Police Department who, while on a case in Las Vegas, is shot in the face and nearly killed. Wilton Knight, creator of Knight Industries and founder of FLAG, directs his doctors to save Long's life and reconstruct his face. With his new identity, "Michael Knight", Long is provided with high tech crime-fighting equipment, most notably the car named KITT.
 Hasselhoff also played Garthe Knight, Wilton Knight's estranged son and a criminal mastermind who drives Goliath, a Peterbilt 352 Pacemaker semi-truck armed with rockets, and protected by KITT's Molecular Bonded Shell.
 William Daniels as the voice of KITT, or Knight Industries Two Thousand, the autonomous, artificially intelligent car, with whom Michael Knight is partnered. Daniels, who simultaneously starred on St. Elsewhere, requested not to be credited for his role as KITT's voice.
 Edward Mulhare as Devon Miles, the leader of FLAG, who appeared in every episode to provide mission details to Knight and KITT. He was also the spokesman for FLAG whenever it came under scrutiny.
 Patricia McPherson as Dr. Bonnie Barstow (Seasons 1, 3–4), KITT's chief technician and romantic tension for Michael. The character was dropped after the first season, but due to strong fan reaction and lobbying by Hasselhoff and Mulhare, she was returned for the third season and remained through the end of the series.
 Rebecca Holden as April Curtis (Season 2), chief technician for KITT. The character was written out when Patricia McPherson returned. The connection between the two was never established in any installments.
 Peter Parros as Reginald Cornelius III aka RC3 (Season 4), driver of the FLAG mobile unit and occasional sideman for Michael and KITT.
 Richard Basehart as Wilton Knight, the founder of FLAG, who dies in the pilot episode. Basehart's voice, however, is heard throughout the series, narrating over the intro and outro.

Production

Vehicle

The car used as KITT in the series was a customized 1982 Pontiac Firebird Trans Am, that cost US$100,000 to build. The nose and dashboard of the car were designed by design consultant Michael Scheffe.

Stuntman Jack Gill says KITT's ride height was dropped 1.5 inches (4 cm) from a stock Trans Am. The hero car was the only vehicle that contained the intricate dashboard. Spare cars were always on hand, and Universal eventually did all of the modifications that were needed. A mock up dashboard was used on a sound stage for closeups of the voice box or other buttons.

Glen Larson wanted the talking muscle car to have a heartbeat and asked Scheffe to design a beam of light like the Cylons had in Battlestar Galactica to be used on the front of the vehicle. The Pontiac's nose was eventually extended slightly.

Gill said that the studio got the cars from Pontiac for $1 apiece, but Pontiac often gave the studio vehicles that had already been damaged from a train derailment. The only car Universal had to pay for was the hero car.

For the scenes in which KITT appeared to be driving without a driver, Gill would sit behind the driver's seat. Gill would extend his arms and legs through the seat out of sight. A two-way mirror was created that hid Gill during scenes where KITT appeared to be driving solo. KITT was never seen driving for long periods of time solo because of the difficulty of shooting it.

William Daniels, the voice of KITT, would record his lines after the majority of the episode was filmed. Hasselhoff would work with an assistant off-camera who would read him KITT's lines. If KITT was in motion during filming, the lines would be read to Hasselhoff through the car stereo. The vehicle was usually towed during scenes when Hasselhoff appeared to be driving.

The studio held a marketing campaign for Knight Rider. Fans could write to the network and they would receive a pamphlet detailing some features about KITT. The first campaign was held in August 1982. The pamphlet said, "The Competition is NO Competition!" KITT was pictured parked alongside a vehicle that resembled the General Lee from Dukes of Hazzard.

Soundtrack
The "Knight Rider Theme" was composed by Stu Phillips and Glen A. Larson. The series DVD bonus material contains an interview about this lead music, where Glen A. Larson says he remembers a theme out of a classical piece ("Marche Et Cortège De Bacchus" Act III – No. 14 from Sylvia written by French composer Léo Delibes) from which he took pieces for the "Knight Rider Theme". The decision to use synthesizers was largely a network decision. Larson claims that they used five or six synthesizers, drums and a Fender bass.

The rest of the series music was composed by Stu Phillips for 13 episodes and Don Peake for 75 episodes. Glen A. Larson co-wrote music for one episode and Morton Stevens wrote the music for one episode.  Peake took over scoring duties at S1E14 in 1983, when Larson moved to Twentieth Century-Fox and Phillips was working there on his projects. Peake remained as the series sole composer until the end of the series in 1986, with the exception of "K.I.T.T. vs. K.A.R.R." in third season, which he composed together with Stu Phillips and Glen A. Larson.

In 2005, FSM released a disc of music from the series, featuring the series theme, ad bumpers and Phillips' scores for "Knight of the Phoenix" (the pilot), "Not a Drop to Drink", "Trust Doesn't Rust", "Forget Me Not" and the composer's final episode "Inside Out", as well as the logo music for Glen Larson Productions. Albums of Don Peake's scores have also been issued.

Episodes

The intro throughout most of the episodes began with this narration:

During the first season, the outro was Michael and KITT driving on a road in the desert with Wilton Knight's words of "One man can make a difference, Michael." These words were phased out after episode 7, "Not A Drop To Drink".

Then the narration goes on to say:

The outro of Seasons 2 and 3 was Michael and KITT driving away from the sunset toward the camera. Season 4's outro was the same, except with KITT in Super Pursuit Mode.

Critical reception
At review aggregator Rotten Tomatoes, the first season scores 35%, with an average rating of 5.60/10. Tom Shales, writing for The Washington Post: Knight Rider' is all revved up but has no place to go, except, maybe, headlong into a large brick wall."

Syndication and home media

In syndication
Knight Rider was first syndicated in the U.S. in the Fall of 1986.  Stations were initially offered either the original hour-long format (with three minutes cut from each episode), or severely-condensed into half-hour format. Reruns were later syndicated on USA Network in 1994, Sci-Fi Channel in 2003, Sleuth in 2005, and on G4 in 2012.

DVD releases
Universal Studios has released all four seasons of Knight Rider on DVD in regions 1, 2 & 4. A complete series box set featuring all 90 episodes in a collector's edition box has been released in regions 1 & 2.

On March 8, 2016, it was announced that Mill Creek Entertainment had acquired the rights to the series in Region 1; they subsequently re-released the first two seasons on DVD on May 3, 2016.  On October 4, 2016, Mill Creek re-released Knight Rider - The Complete Series on DVD in Region 1.

Blu-ray releases
In Japan, NBCUniversal Entertainment Japan—a subsidiary of NBCUniversal—released a Blu-ray box set containing all four seasons, replicas, props, and memorabilia under the title ナイトライダー コンプリート ブルーレイBOX (Knight Rider: The Complete Series). The set is limited to Region Code A, which includes the U.S. It was released on November 27, 2014.

In North America, Mill Creek Entertainment released the complete series on Blu-ray in Region 1 on October 4, 2016.

On December 30, 2022, German company Turbine worked with Universal to put together Knight Rider: The 40th Anniversary Edition Blu-Ray Collection.  This set is a restored uncut version with the original music when it first aired on NBC.  The series is on 20 discs with 3 bonus discs and includes bonus features about the series, and the Knight Rider 2000 and Knight Rider 2010 movies in SD.  Also in SD is all 22 episodes of the series Team Knight Rider. The discs are in English & German Audio and also have English and German with subtitles.  The discs are A/B/C (Region Free) and will play in all Blu-ray players.  The set comes with 2 two-sided Knight Rider posters, some collectors post cards of the cast, copies of Michael Knight's ID Cards, and driver's licenses from the series, 2 stickers and thick episode guide book mostly in German.  This is a limited edition set with only 3,939 copies made.

Digital streaming
The series' first season was available on Hulu. It is available for streaming on Netflix and Peacock, and can be purchased on Prime Video and Vudu.

Spin-offs and sequels

These adventures were continued with the television films Knight Rider 2000 and Knight Rider 2010 and the short-lived Team Knight Rider. One other television movie, Knight Rider, served as a pilot for the 2008 television series Knight Rider. In 1985, a spin-off series, Code of Vengeance, also premiered.

In 1988, Angelo di Marco made a French comic strip based on the series, titled K2000 and published by Dargaud.

In popular culture

In 1984, "Hooray for Hollywood", a two-part episode of Diff'rent Strokes, David Hasselhoff and KITT (not voiced by William Daniels) appeared when rescuing Arnold Jackson (Gary Coleman) and Dudley Ramsey (Shavar Ross) from a near on-set incident while visiting Universal Studios Hollywood.

The 2000 video game The Operative: No One Lives Forever had a reference to Michael Knight in a H.A.R.M. Dossier. It listed the characters description in the opening narration.

The F.L.A.G. organization is featured throughout the 2007–2010 Image Universe comic book series Dynamo 5, with supporting character Maddie Warner being a former agent of the organization.

On July 8, 2008, GPS manufacturer Mio Technology announced the release of a Knight Rider–themed GPS unit for a price of $270. The unit has the original Knight Rider logo printed above the display and features the voice of William Daniels.

In 2012 and 2013, General Electric ran an advertising campaign, "Brilliant Machines", about the coming generation of General Electric robotic devices. The campaign was built around famous robots from the movies and television, and K.I.T.T. was prominently featured. One ad, narrated by William Daniels, showed K.I.T.T. in Autocruise mode pacing a GE diesel-electric railroad engine hauling a freight train.

In 2014, Fast 'n Loud did a two-part episode, "Don't Hassle The Hoff", built around a friend of Richard Rawlings' desire to own a KITT replicar. Part II features the replicar engaging in a number of Knight Rider–style stunts.

In 2015, both David Hasselhoff and KITT (voiced by Seth MacFarlane) appear in a Comic-Con segment in the unrated version of Ted 2. Hasselhoff and KITT later paired together again for an AT&T/DirecTV advertisement which also featured other film/television personalities such as Big Bird and the Oklahoma Sooners football team interspersed with the daily workings of a major city as someone walks around using the service's TV Everywhere initiative.

In 2018, Wal-Mart made an ad promoting their new curbside pickup service starring epic Hollywood automobiles. KITT is featured in four shots and has a spoken line.

The Kolkata Knight Riders cricket club in India is named in honor of the series.

Music
The Knight Rider theme heavily borrowed from Léo Delibes' "Procession of Bacchus" from the ballet Sylvia. The theme has been sampled in the songs "Clock Strikes", "Fire It Up", and "Mundian to Bach Ke".  It was also featured as Ted's ringtone for John's phone in the 2012 comedy film Ted.

See also

References

Further reading

Non-fiction
 
 
Joe Huth, David Bronstein: Knight Rider: 30 Years of a Lone Crusader and His Talking Car (Isbn) 9781478221470

Fiction
 Glen Larson and Roger Hill (1983). Knight Rider. Pinnacle Books. .  Adapted from and expanded upon the feature-length / two-part pilot episode — among other differences, Tanya is shot in the face rather than the chest in the climax.
 Glen Larson and Roger Hill (1984). Knight Rider: Trust Doesn't Rust. Pinnacle Books. .  Adapted from and expanded upon the first-season episode of the same name.
 Glen Larson and Roger Hill (1984). Knight Rider: Hearts of Stone. Pinnacle Books. .  Adapted from and expanded upon the first-season episode of the same name.
 Glen Larson and Roger Hill (1984). Knight Rider: The 24-Carat Assassin. (UK publication only)  Adapted from and expanded upon the feature-length / two-part second-season episode 'Mouth of the Snake'. The back of the book actually states that it is adapted from All That Glitters – the working title for the story.
 Glen Larson and Roger Hill (1984). Knight Rider: Mirror Image. (UK publication only)  Adapted from and expanded upon the feature-length / two-part second-season episode Goliath. The back of the book states that it is adapted from Goliath and Goliath Returns, but the actual story is only adapted from Goliath''. One interesting difference is that in the book, Garthe Knight is called Garthe Bishop. This novel also states that April is Devon's daughter, but this was never used in the series and is not considered canon.

An annual was published each year in the UK by Grandreams. These books consisted of a mix of text stories and cartoon strips, as well as photos and articles on the show's stars and KITT. There were five annuals produced in total, each reflecting the season of the show that was airing at the time, with the final two releases covering the final season. (The last annual was printed in a quite small quantity, due to the fading popularity of the show, and is thus considerably rarer.)

External links

 
 
 includes episode guide, and David Hasselhoff biography
 "Knight Rider" page on NBC Classics

1980s American science fiction television series
1982 American television series debuts
1986 American television series endings
American action television series
1980s American crime drama television series
Television series about robots
English-language television shows
Knight Rider television series
NBC original programming
Television series by Universal Television
Television series created by Glen A. Larson
Television shows set in Los Angeles County, California
Television shows adapted into comics
K